Turchaninov (sometimes transliterated as Turchin) was a surname of several noble families in the Russian Empire. The surname Turchaninov might have originated from the archaic word turchanin, meaning "Turk". That was the traditional name that was given to the Turkish prisoners captured during numerous Russo-Turkish wars.

Alexander Turchaninov 

Alexander Turchaninov was the son of the Turkish officer. As a boy he was taken prisoner, baptised and taken to the court. Alexander fulfilled the valet's duties at the court since 1754. On 22 January 1762 Alexander Turchaninov by the decree of the Emperor Peter III was granted the rank of Colonel. He was also granted nobility. On 19 December 1796 Paul I confirmed the title and extended it to Alexander Turchaninov's heirs. His children Peter and Pavel served in the Imperial Russian Army as Rittmeister of the 3rd Hussar Regiment, his daughter Anna (1774–1848) was a poet. Her works were published in Saint Petersburg. The collection of her poetry Otryvki iz sochinenij (lit. "Fragments from works") was published in Saint Petersburg in 1803. Lettres philosophiques de Mr. Fontaine et de m-lle Tourtchaniniff was published in Paris in 1817.

Philip Turchaninov 

Another Turchaninov line originated in the 17th century. The founder of the dynasty was Philip Turchaninov, whose origin is unknown. One theory states that he was a Turk prisoner brought to Russia during the Russo-Turkish War of 1676–1681. His son Mikhail married Anna Rostovshikova, the daughter of the Solikamsk manufacturer. The main industry at Solikamsk was salt production, which Mikhail tried at first, but then switched to copper mining. In 1731 he managed to build his own factory, the Troitsky Copper Smelting Plant. 
The family's rise to prominence is associated with successful Ural businessman Alexei Turchaninov. He was a simple salesman, who married Mikhail's daughter and inherited the factory. He was made a nobleman by Catherine the Great in 1783. From his second wife Filatseta Stepanovna, he had 8 children, most notably:

 Natalya (1773–1834), married Nikolay Koltovsky in 1789. Had two sons Pavel and Vladimir from liaison with Dmitry Tatishchev. Their successors ran the plants till 1912.
 Yelizaveta (1774–1827), married Alexey Titov.
 Nadezhda (1778–1850), married Mark Ivelich, Russian diplomat and the Lieutenant general of Serbian descent, in 1798. He later became a member of the Governing Senate. One of their sons Nicholai Ivelich (1797–1875) became a count.

Notable family members 
 Alexei Turchaninov (1704/1705–1787)
 Pavel Solomirsky (1801–1861)
 Dmitry Solomirsky, his son
 Alexander Turchaninov (1838–1907), Russian lawyer.

Noble family of Don Cossacks 

The Turchaninovs was a noble family of Don Cossacks origin from stanitsa  Aksayskaya and Starocherkasskaya.

 Notable family members
 Vasily Nikolaevich Turchaninov
 Ivan Turchaninov (1821–1901) came from it. He was later known as John Basil Turchin, a Union army brigadier general in the American Civil War.

See also 
 Pyotr Ivanovitch Turchaninov (born 1746 – c. 1823), Secretary of State on military questions of Catherine I of Russia.
 Pavel Turchaninov (1776–1839), Russian lieutenant general during Napoleonic wars.
 Andrey Turchaninov (1779–1830), his younger brother, the lieutenant general during Napoleonic wars.

References

External links

 Shumkov, A.A., Ryklis, I.G. List of noble families of the Don Cossacks in alphabetical order. VIRD Publ House, Sankt-Peterburg. 2000, 

Russian noble families
Don Cossacks noble families
Russian people of Turkish descent
People from the Russian Empire of Turkish descent